The men's individual pursuit at the 2008 Summer Olympics took place on August 16 at the Laoshan Velodrome. The pre-event favorite to win the gold medal was the defending Olympic champion Bradley Wiggins of Great Britain, who managed to retain the title, setting a new Olympic record in the preliminary round.

Qualification 
Eighteen cyclists qualified for this event. Bradley Wiggins (Great Britain), the defending Olympic champion, qualified for winning the individual pursuit at the 2008 UCI Track Cycling World Championships. Volodymyr Dyudya (Ukraine) qualified at the late 2007 UCI World Cup event in Sydney, winning the individual pursuit there. The qualifier by way of the UCI B World Championship was Alexandr Pliuschin (Moldova). Jenning Huizenga (Netherlands), Taylor Phinney (United States), Phillip Thuaux (Australia), Sergi Escobar Roure (Spain), Alexander Serov (Russia), and David O'Loughlin (Ireland) qualified based on UCI rankings. The rest of the field was formed by berths given to the ten nations that qualified in the team pursuit. This resulted in Great Britain, Australia, Netherlands, Spain, Ukraine, and Russia each having two competitors in this event.

Competition format 
The eighteen cyclists were matched into nine two-man heats. The riders start on opposite sides of the track from one another, held in place by a starting gate until the race begins. While the objective is ostensibly to catch the other rider on the track, victory is most commonly determined by the faster time to cover 4,000 meters. The winners of each individual heat did not matter in the preliminaries - it was instead the overall eight fastest times which would advance to the match round.

In the match round, the top eight riders from the preliminaries were matched together, 1 vs. 8, 2 vs. 7, 3 vs. 6, and 4 vs. 5, for the semifinals. In the semifinals, the winner of each match advanced to race for a medal; the two fastest raced for gold and silver, while the two slower winners faced each other for the bronze.

Schedule 
All times are China standard time (UTC+8)

Results

Qualification

Match round

Semifinals
Qualification rule: Two fastest cyclists advance to the gold medal match (Q), while the next two to the bronze medal match (q).

Medal round
Bronze medal match 

Gold medal match

References

External links 
NBC Olympics: Cycling

Track cycling at the 2008 Summer Olympics
Cycling at the Summer Olympics – Men's individual pursuit
Men's events at the 2008 Summer Olympics